Phylloporus novae-zelandiae is a species of fungus in the family Boletaceae. It was originally discovered in New Zealand in 1971.

novae-zelandiae
Fungi of New Zealand
Fungi described in 1971